Robin Hood: Prince of Thieves is a 1991 adventure film about the legendary outlaw Robin Hood.

Robin Hood: Prince of Thieves may also refer to:

Robin Hood: Prince of Thieves (video game), a 1991 video game tie-in
Robin Hood: Prince of Thieves (2009 film), a 2009 Indian film

See also
The Prince of Thieves, a 1948 Robin Hood film
Robin Hood (disambiguation)
Prince of Thieves (disambiguation)